George Seymour may refer to: 
Sir George Seymour, English knight
George Seymour (Royal Navy officer) (1787–1870), British admiral
Lord George Seymour (1763–1848), British politician
George Hamilton Seymour (1797–1880), British diplomat, son of the above
George Seymour, 7th Marquess of Hertford (1871–1940)
Henry Seymour (Royal Navy officer) (George Henry Seymour, 1818–1869), MP for Antrim
George Dudley Seymour (1859–1945), American historian, patent attorney and city planner
George Fitzroy Seymour (1923–1994), High Sheriff of Nottinghamshire in 1966
George Franklin Seymour (1829–1906), bishop of Springfield in the Episcopal Church
George Seymour, Mayor of the Fraser Coast, Queensland, Australia
Stan Seymour (George Stanley Seymour, 1895–1978), English football player and manager

See also
, English migrant ship

Seymour, George